Kolej Yayasan UEM or KYUEM (formerly known as Kolej Matrikulasi Yayasan Saad) is a Malaysian private boarding school in Lembah Beringin, Selangor, Malaysia. It is owned by Yayasan UEM, and is also part of the UEM Group. KYUEM offers the A-Level programme under the Cambridge Assessment International Education examination board.

Planned by Tan Sri Halim Saad, Kolej Matrikulasi Yayasan Saad (as it was then known) is a residential college, modelling after British boarding schools. The teaching staff consists of Malaysians as well as expatriate teachers. The college attempts to keep the ratio of 60% local teachers and 40% expatriates.

KYUEM is known to be a 'premier' A-Levels college, with its students consistently attaining Outstanding Cambridge Learner Awards and securing offers into the highest ranking universities.

Overview
KYUEM boards approximately 524 students mostly between the ages of 16 to 20.

The college is headed by the headmaster who is appointed by the Board of Governors and Board of Trustees. Each is headed by a houseparent, selected from the members of the teaching or administrative staff.

Nearly all of the school's graduates achieve conditional offers into universities through the UCAS application process, several to Oxford or Cambridge every year and a majority to universities such as University College London, Imperial College London, University of Warwick, London School of Economics, King's College London, University of Edinburgh and The University of Manchester. Some of the graduates study at universities in the United States such as MIT, UC Berkeley, Princeton University and Harvard University.

Curriculum
In addition to the core A-level subjects, it is compulsory for the students to take IELTS as it is a requirement for admission into universities in the United Kingdom.

Most students take four A-Level subjects, but many also take three. The A-Level subjects offered are:
 by the Arts Department – Accounting, Economics, English Literature, History and Geography.
 by the Science Department – Biology, Chemistry, Physics and Marine Science.
 by Mathematics Department – Mathematics and Further Mathematics.

Facilities
Students either live in one of the 104 chalets - 42 for male and 62 for female students; one of the 8 villas, 5 for male and 3 for female students; the apartments usually housing girls. Each chalet houses two students, each with their own room and toilet. Each villa unit houses four students, with 2 people sharing a toilet. Each apartment unit houses four students, each with their own toilet.

In 2006, one of the staff apartments - Block F - was renovated to allow for more student accommodation, due to a shortage of housing. Although the apartments were readied in time for the July 2006 student intake, there were sufficient chalets to accommodate all the students at the time. During that time, alumni returning to college for events such as the annual Alumni Weekend stayed there. The apartments have begun to be used by students in the January 2007 intake. A new block was completed in July 2006. The second floor of the block is used by the Arts department for classes, whereas the old Arts department classes (on the ground floor of the Academic Block) were converted into science laboratories.

The teachers and staff live in apartments provided on-site. The teachers' apartments consist of three blocks situated next to the boys' chalet area, whereas the staff apartments are located behind the female students' chalet area. The Headmaster has decreed that the maximum number of cats allowed in each staff apartment is two.

The college has 10 science laboratories, two lecture theatres, three IT laboratories which supply access to the internet connection and air-conditioned classes. Initially, there was only one academic block, with only eight science laboratories. However, a new block was added in 2006, and the non-laboratory classes on the ground floor were renovated to become two science laboratories.

The college has an Olympic-size swimming pool, a football field, two basketball courts, two tennis courts, two volleyball court, and a multipurpose hall. As well as housing two squash courts, the multipurpose hall can be used as a futsal court, four badminton courts, or a basketball court (not simultaneously). Usually, it is set up to form 3 badminton courts, with the area of the final badminton court used to set up ping-pong tables.

Comprehensive CCTV is currently being installed to adequately monitor the student population to guard against future incidents of thefts from student chalets.

House system
Students at KYUEM are sorted into four houses: Diamond, Garnet, Sapphire and Topaz. Friendly rivalries between the houses is a norm in the school, especially in sports, annual cultural competition (Bangsawan) and the end of year House Cup.

Clubs and societies
Students, when they are not participating in lessons, assemblies or tutor periods have the freedom to join in club and society activities after lessons and in the evenings. There are frequent evening events held in the Great Hall, such as the Chinese Cultural Society, and Traditional Dance and Dikir Barat inter-house competitions.

 Arabic Fellowship,
 Badminton Club,
 Chess Club,
 Chinese Cultural Club,
 Christian Fellowship,
 Computing Society,
 Creative Club,
 Cultural Club,
 Culinary Art Club,
 Cycling Club,
 Debate Club,
 Film and Cinema Society,
 Football Club,
 WWF Club,
 Indian Cultural Club,
 Japanese Cultural Club,
 Malay Cultural Club (MCC)
 Model United Nation,
 MUSCOM (Musolla Community)
 Music Club,
 Natural History Club,
 Peer Support Group,
 Photography Club,
 Public Speaking Club,
 Research & Development Club,
 Robotic Club,
 Rugby Club,
 Scrabble Club
 Kolej Yayasan UEM Research Institute

College magazine
Veritas is the official school magazine, which only publishes once a year. It is also the longest-running college publication. Edited by students under the Veritas Club at the college, although liable to censorship, it has a tradition of satirising and even attacking school policies, as well as documenting recent events. The magazine is published for record and as a forum for comment and debate. It does not have the expression of individual opinions in the school.

See also 
 Education in Malaysia
 List of post-secondary institutions in Malaysia
 List of schools in Selangor

References

External links
 Kolej Yayasan UEM website

Boarding schools in Malaysia
Private schools in Malaysia
Colleges in Malaysia
Cambridge schools in Malaysia
Secondary schools in Malaysia
Universities and colleges in Selangor
UEM Group
Educational institutions established in 1998
1998 establishments in Malaysia
Schools in Selangor